Jean Robert II Tronchin (3 October 1710, Geneva - 11 March 1793, Rolle), also known as Tronchin-Boissier (Boissier was his wife's name), Attorney General, member of the State Council of Geneva was the son of Jean Tronchin (1672–1761). He busied himself on a friendly basis in Voltaire's interests and maintained a correspondence on artistic subjects with Denis Diderot.

Cabinetmakers of the period gave his name to a species of pretty light reading table with a rack for drawing ("tables à la Tronchin").

Works 
1764: Deux discours sur l'esprit de parti prononcés par M. Tronchin (...) dans l'assemblée du Conseil des Deux-Cent de la République de Genève au commencement de l'année 1762 et au commencement de l'année 1764, Neufchâtel.
1765:  Lettres écrites de la campagne, Geneva

External links 
 Tronchin, Jean-Robert on Dictionnaire historique de la Suisse

18th-century politicians from the Republic of Geneva
1710 births
1793 deaths